Lima Allen County Airport  is six miles southeast of Lima, in Allen County, Ohio. It is owned by the Allen County Regional Airport Authority.

History
The airport is near the corner of Hanthorn Road and SR 117 east of Lima. It moved to this site in 1962; until then, the airport was a few miles northwest of Lima near the village of Elida.

Airline flights (Lake Central DC-3s) started at the old airport in 1953-54; successors Allegheny Airlines and Allegheny Commuter  continued at the new airport until the early 1970s.

Northern Airlines provided airline service to Lima in the late 1960s. A total of six weekday departures (fewer on weekends) served nonstop service to Dayton, Findlay, & St. Marys OH.

In 1983/1984, Trans Midwest Airlines flew an average of 7 daily flights from Lima using Piper Navajo equipment. Nonstop flights went to CVG, CMH, DAY, & TOL with direct service to CRW, PKB, & HTS.

The studios of local television station WLMA are in a hangar at the old airport site.

Facilities
Originally the airport had two runways: 10/28 is 6,000 by 150 feet (1,829 x 46 m) asphalt/fully grooved; 14/32 is 3,994 by 150 feet (1,217 x 46 m), asphalt and grass. Runway 14/32 was closed in the winter months. The grass runway was removed in 2013. Lack of use, maintenance, and never favoring a crosswind were all determining factors involved with its de-commissioning.

In the year ending June 1, 2007 the airport had 32,500 aircraft operations, average 89 per day: 80% general aviation, 18.5% air taxi, and 1.5% military. 28 aircraft were then based at this airport: 71% single-engine, 25% multi-engine and 4% jet.

References

External links 
 Aerial photo from USGS The National Map
 

Airports in Ohio
Buildings and structures in Allen County, Ohio
Transportation in Allen County, Ohio